That Sort is a 1916 American silent drama film directed by Charles Brabin and starring Warda Howard, Duncan McRae and Ernest Maupain.

Cast
 Warda Howard as Diana Laska
 Duncan McRae as John Heppell
 Ernest Maupain as Doctor Maxwell
 John Lorenz as Philip Goddier
 Betty Brown as Maureen Heppell
 Peggy Sweeney as An actress
 Marian Skinner as Mrs. Heppell

References

Bibliography
Parish, James Robert & Pitts, Michael R. . Film Directors: A Guide to their American Films. Scarecrow Press, 1974.

External links
 

1916 films
1916 drama films
1910s English-language films
American silent feature films
Silent American drama films
American black-and-white films
Films directed by Charles Brabin
Essanay Studios films
1910s American films